Zhangna (Mandarin: 章纳乡) is a township in Litang County, Garzê Tibetan Autonomous Prefecture, Sichuan, China.

References 

Township-level divisions of Sichuan
Populated places in the Garzê Tibetan Autonomous Prefecture